Moldova–Russia relations are the bilateral relations between the Republic of Moldova and the Russian Federation, two Eastern European, post-Soviet, ex-communist countries. Russian support for the self-proclaimed Pridnestrovian Moldavian Republic (Transnistria)  and a substantial Russian military presence therein strained Moldovan relations with Russia.

Russo-Moldovan relations became a main focus of foreign policy for Republic of Moldova after the collapse of the Soviet Union. During the Transnistria War, Russia gave formal and informal support to Moldovan secessionist, direct intervention of Russian 14th Guards Army stationed in Moldova on behalf of the secessionist side resulted in end to fighting and the emergence of the internationally unrecognized entity of Transnistria.

History

Following its victory in the Russo-Turkish War 1806–1812, the Russian empire annexed Bessarabia from the Ottoman Empire. This historical region, which was originally part of the Principality of Moldavia, constitutes most of the territory of modern Moldova.

In the early 20th century, Bessarabia briefly gained independence from Russia as the Moldavian Democratic Republic. In 1918 it entered into a union with the Kingdom of Romania, with whom it shares the same language and ethnicity. It was ceded by Romania to the Soviet Union in 1940. This led to the establishment of the Moldavian Soviet Socialist Republic.

Following the dissolution of the Soviet Union, Moldavian SSR (renamed to SSR Moldova) then declared its independence from the USSR on August 27, 1991.

Current relations
Russo-Moldovan relations became a main focus of foreign policy for newly established Republic of Moldova. During the war of Transnistria, Russia gave formal and informal support to Moldovan secessionist, direct intervention of Russian 14th Guards Army stationed in Moldova on behalf of the secessionist side resulted in an end to the fighting and the emergence of the internationally unrecognized entity of Transnistria. Russian-brokered ceasefire, cemented the status quo, and left two separate groups of Russian military forces remained in Moldova: a small peacekeeping regiment, which is part of the Joint Control Commission, and the 14th Army, which was tasked with guarding a large Soviet ammunition depot in Cobasna on Transnistria-controlled territory. Evacuation of this depot was eventually stalled and Russian military presence in Moldova continues to this day, against the will of the Moldovan Government.

Following 1997 Moscow memorandum, Russia and Moldova signed an agreement on military co-operation. In 1999, an agreement on economic co-operation was signed and Russia committed itself to withdraw its troops and weapons from Moldova by the end of 2002, which did not happen. Relations between Moldova and Russia deteriorated in November 2003 over a Russian proposal for the solution of the Transnistria conflict, which Moldovan authorities refused to accept. In 2006, a diplomatic conflict resulted in the Russian ban of Moldovan wines, damaging the wine industry of Moldova considerably, as Russia remained the largest importer of Moldovan wines by far.

On September 8, 2015, after a Russian military attaché attended at a military parade celebrating the proclamation of Transnistria the Moldovan government called it an "unfriendly" action on Moscow's part and suspended military relations with the Russian Federation. On July 21, 2017, Moldovan parliament passed a declaration asking calling for the removal of Russian troops, weapons, and military equipment from the Transnistria region. After the Constitutional Court of Moldova ruled that the "stationing of any military troops or bases on the territory of the Republic of Moldova, managed and controlled by foreign states, is unconstitutional."

In the 10 years that followed, the Moldovan parliament became dominated by pro-European parties who sought to move the country away from Russian influence and to move closer to Romania and the European Union (EU). In December 2016, Igor Dodon, the leader of the Party of Socialists of the Republic of Moldova, was elected to the presidency with a pro-Russian platform, and a promise to identify with the former Soviet Union and Eastern Bloc. Since becoming president, he has visited the Russian Federation numerous times on state and working visits, having visited the country over a dozen times by January 2019. He was, however, defeated in the 2020 Moldovan presidential election by Maia Sandu, who became the new President of Moldova.

During the worldwide COVID-19 pandemic, Russia helped Moldova with its vaccination campaign with 71,000 Sputnik V COVID-19 vaccine units twice, once on 24 April 2021 and another on 30 April 2021. Vaccination with this vaccine officially started in Moldova on 4 May 2021. However, these deliveries provoked many controversies, first because former Moldovan President Dodon was accused of inflating the number of vaccine units Russia gave to Moldova, later because Russia gave vaccine doses to Transnistria without the intermediation of the Moldovan authorities as had been done previously with donations from other countries, and lastly because it was claimed Russia had given Moldova vaccine units that were supposed to go to Slovakia but which the country rejected later.

2022 Russian invasion of Ukraine
On 25 February 2022, during the Russian invasion of Ukraine, the Moldovan chemical tanker , which was navigating through the Black Sea at the time, was shelled by Russian military forces.

In light of the invasion of Ukraine, the government of Moldova banned the Russian military symbols V and Z on 7 April 2022. Pro-Russian parties in Moldova protested the ban on the nationalist symbols, accusing the Moldovan government of erasing their history. Furthermore, it was reported that ethnic Russians in Moldova vandalised the World War II  following this decision. The spokeswoman for the Russian Foreign Ministry, Maria Zakharova, and Russian senator Aleksey Pushkov condemned the Moldovan government's ban on the nationalist symbols.

On 22 April, the Russian major general Rustam Minnekayev said that one of the objectives of the Russian invasion of Ukraine was to establish a land corridor with occupied Transnistria, claiming that there was "evidence that the Russian-speaking population is being oppressed" in the region without giving further detail on the issue. Following this, a series of explosions of unknown authorship occurred in Transnistria. They may have been a false flag operation by Russia or Transnistria.

In May 2022, the Russian hacking group Killnet attacked several websites of official institutions in Moldova. 

In August 2022, Russia banned the import of most agricultural products from Moldova, after Russia claimed that they contained "dangerous quarantine objects". However, it is speculated that the real reason for the ban is because Moldova asked for an extension on payment for its August supply of natural gas from Russia. Russia has a history of using trade as a weapon in disputes over energy and energy payments.

On 30 September, after the annexation referendums in Russian-occupied Ukraine and the Russian annexation of Donetsk, Kherson, Luhansk and Zaporizhzhia oblasts, Sandu declared that the 2022 Russian invasion of Ukraine had "dramatically affected" relations between Moldova and Russia.

On 10 October, amid a series of Russian missile strikes over Ukrainian cities, the Moldovan Minister of Foreign Affairs and European Integration Nicu Popescu announced that three Russian missiles had breached Moldovan airspace. Popescu strongly condemned this and said that Russia's ambassador to Moldova had been summoned as a result of this incident. Later, on 31 October, Russia launched a new wave of missile strikes over Ukraine. One of the Russian missiles was taken down by a Ukrainian air defence system and crashed into Naslavcea, a village within the territory of Moldova. Although windows of some residential buildings on the village were shattered, no casualties were reported. Moldovan authorities strongly condemned this new wave of Russian strikes. On 5 December, as a result of another Russian wave of attacks against Ukraine, a missile fell near the city of Briceni within Moldova's territory. On 14 January 2023, due to yet another wave of missile strikes, another missile fell into the Moldovan village of Larga, violating Moldova's airspace. Russia violated Moldovan airspace once again on 10 February. On 16 February 2023, a missile violated the airspace of Moldova and the Moldovan police found missile debris in Larga once again.

Transnistria

Transnistria, a de facto independent region of Moldova, is supported by Russia, although Russia has not recognised Transnistria. There have been proposals in Transnistria for joining the Russian Federation.

State visits
In March 2017, Prime Minister Pavel Filip ordered a ban of official visits by government officials to Russia. This ban was lifted by Prime Minister Maia Sandu in June 2019.

Visits of Russian leaders to Moldova
 President Vladimir Putin (June 2000)
 Prime Minister Vladimir Putin (November 2008)
 President Dmitry Medvedev (October 2009)

President Dodon floated a potential visit by Putin in August 2019, however it did not eventuate.

Visits of Moldovan leaders to Russia

 President Petru Lucinschi (July 2000)
 President Vladimir Voronin (September 2001)
 President Vladimir Voronin (June 2009)
 President Igor Dodon (January 2017)
 President Igor Dodon (May 2017)
 President Igor Dodon (May 2020)

See also
Dissolution of the Soviet Union
List of ambassadors of Russia to Moldova
Greater Russia
Moldova–European Union relations
Romania–Russia relations
Transnistria conflict
2022–2023 Moldovan energy crisis

References

 
Russia
Bilateral relations of Russia